Gerardo Lagunes Gallina (born 15 May 1975) is a Mexican politician from the Institutional Revolutionary Party. From 2006 to 2009 he served as Deputy of the LX Legislature of the Mexican Congress representing Veracruz, and previously served as municipal president of Nogales Municipality, Veracruz.

References

1975 births
Living people
Politicians from Veracruz
Institutional Revolutionary Party politicians
21st-century Mexican politicians
Deputies of the LX Legislature of Mexico
Members of the Chamber of Deputies (Mexico) for Veracruz
People from Orizaba
Municipal presidents in Veracruz